Albany Empire may refer to:

 Albany Theatre (formerly the Albany Empire), a multi-purpose arts centre in Deptford, South London
 Albany Empire (AFL), a former professional arena football team based in Albany, New York
 Albany Empire (NAL), National Arena League indoor football team in Albany, New York

See also 
 MV Empire Albany, later renamed Albany
 Albany (disambiguation)